Haluk Yamaç (born 19 November 1957) is a Turkish fencer. He competed in the individual foil event at the 1984 Summer Olympics.

References

External links
 

1957 births
Living people
Turkish male foil fencers
Olympic fencers of Turkey
Fencers at the 1984 Summer Olympics
20th-century Turkish people